Kiskeam or Kishkeam is a village in North West County Cork, Ireland. It is in the civil parish of Kilmeen in the Barony of Duhallow. Kiskeam is within the Cork North-West Dáil constituency.

Transport
Kiskeam lies on the R577 road which connects the N72 at Cloonbannin Cross to Castleisland and the N21, linking Mallow to Tralee.

The closest rail links include Millstreet, Rathmore and Mallow train stations.

Sport
In men sports Kiskeam is represented by Kiskeam GAA which is a Gaelic Football club only and competes in the Cork Senior Football Championship.

In women's Gaelic football Kiskeam play for Araglen Desmonds Bui which is a combined team representing Kiskeam, Ballydesmond and Boherbue.

References 

Towns and villages in County Cork